Cleisthenes herzensteini is a flatfish of the family Pleuronectidae. It is a demersal fish that lives on bottoms in the temperate waters of the northwest Pacific, from the Sea of Okhotsk to the Sea of Japan, Yellow Sea, Gulf of Bohai and the East China Sea.

Nomenclature
Both species in the genus Cleisthenes – Cleisthenes herzensteini and Cleisthenes pinetorum – are commonly known as sôhachi in Japan.

Diet
The diet of Cleisthenes herzensteini consists of zoobenthos organisms, including fish and crustaceans such as crabs, shrimp and prawns.

References

Pleuronectidae
Fish of the Pacific Ocean
Fish described in 1904